Margot Glockshuber (born 26 June 1949) is a former West German pair skater. With partner Wolfgang Danne, she is the 1968 Winter Olympics bronze medalist. They are also the 1967 World and European silver medalists.

Results
(with Wolfgang Danne)

References
 Database Olympics
 Pairs on Ice profile
 Skatabase: 1960s Worlds
 Skatabase: 1960s Europeans

1949 births
Living people
Sportspeople from Frankfurt
German female pair skaters
Figure skaters at the 1968 Winter Olympics
Olympic bronze medalists for West Germany
Olympic figure skaters of West Germany
Olympic medalists in figure skating
World Figure Skating Championships medalists
European Figure Skating Championships medalists

Medalists at the 1968 Winter Olympics